Lim Heung-sin (born January 1, 1967) is a South Korean field hockey coach. At the 2012 Summer Olympics he coached the Korea women's national field hockey team.

References

1967 births
Living people
South Korean field hockey coaches
South Korean male field hockey players